Zoveyr-e Kharamzeh (also Romanized as Zoveyr-e Kharāmzeh; also known as Kharamza and Kharmazeh) is a village in Mollasani Rural District, in the Central District of Bavi County, Khuzestan Province, Iran. At the 2006 census, its population was 134, in 24 families.

References 

Populated places in Bavi County